Candelo is a comune (municipality) in the Province of Biella in the Italian region Piedmont, located about  northeast of Turin and about  southeast of Biella.

Candelo borders the following municipalities: Benna, Biella, Cossato, Gaglianico, Valdengo, Verrone, Vigliano Biellese.

Main sights
The Ricetto di Candelo, a fortified storehouse 
Church of Santa Maria Maggiore (12th century)
Church of St. Lawrence, of medieval origins but remade in Baroquestyle in the 18th century
Ysangarda, a medieval archaeological site in the Baragge natural area.

Notable figures
Mario Pozzo
Doctor Zot
Mario Viana

References

External links
 Official website

Cities and towns in Piedmont